"She's My Rock" is a song written by Sharon K. Dobbins. It was first recorded by Stoney Edwards and released as a single in 1972. Edwards' version peaked at No. 20 on the Billboard Hot Country Singles chart.

The song is sometimes recorded by female artists. In these cases, the song becomes "He's My Rock", with the genders changed as appropriate.  Regardless of the song's title—either "He's My Rock" or "She's My Rock"—the song retains the same subject matter: A person who is aware of the seedy past of his/her now-spouse and—when confronted with the facts—strongly defending him/her and warning the antagonist to back off because of his/her own unflattering character.

Cover versions
Brenda Lee covered the song as "He's My Rock" for her 1975 album, Sincerely, Brenda Lee. Lee's rendition peaked at No. 8 on the Billboard Hot Country Singles chart.
Olivia Newton-John also covered the song as "He's My Rock" on her 1975 album Clearly Love.  Though her version was not a single on its own, it did become the B-side of her #13 Billboard Hot 100 and #1 Adult Contemporary hit of that year, "Something Better to Do."
George Jones released a cover of the song in August 1984 as the first single from his album Ladies' Choice. Jones' version reached No. 2 on the Billboard Hot Country Singles chart in December 1984 and No. 1 on the RPM Country Tracks chart in Canada in January 1985.

Chart performance

Stoney Edwards

Brenda Lee

George Jones

References

1972 singles
1975 singles
1984 singles
Stoney Edwards songs
Brenda Lee songs
George Jones songs
Song recordings produced by Ken Nelson (American record producer)
Song recordings produced by Billy Sherrill
Capitol Records singles
MCA Records singles
Epic Records singles
1972 songs